Ectoedemia jubae is a moth of the family Nepticulidae. It is endemic to the Canary Islands.

The wingspan is 4.5-5.5 mm.

The larvae feed on Euphorbia balsamifera, Euphorbia obtusifolia and Euphorbia regis-jubae. They mine the leaves of their host plant. The mine consists of a narrow tortuous corridor, widening into an elongated blotch, that generally does not cross the midrib. Mines are usually found in leaves that are already turning yellow. Pupation takes place outside of the mine.

External links
Fauna Europaea
bladmineerders.nl
lepiforum.eu, containing the original description

Nepticulidae
Moths of Africa
Moths described in 1908